Samuel Kenneth Muhindi (born 12 June 1978) is a Kenyan cyclist. He competed in the men's cross-country mountain biking event at the 2000 Summer Olympics.

References

External links
 

1978 births
Living people
Kenyan male cyclists
Olympic cyclists of Kenya
Cyclists at the 2000 Summer Olympics
Place of birth missing (living people)